Simon James Dawson (June 13, 1818 – October 30, 1902) was a Canadian civil engineer and politician.

Career 
Born in Redhaven, Banffshire, Scotland, Dawson emigrated to Canada as a young man and began his career as an engineer. In 1857, as a member of a Canadian government expedition, he surveyed a line of road from Prince Arthur’s Landing (later Port Arthur, now part of Thunder Bay, Ontario) to Fort Garry and further explored that area in 1858 and 1859. His report greatly stimulated Canadian interest in the West. In 1868, he was placed in charge of construction of a wagon and water route following his earlier survey by the newly formed federal Department of Public Works. The Dawson road was traversed in 1870 by the Wolseley Expedition under the command of Colonel Garnet Wolseley sent to preserve order during the first Riel uprising, the Red River Rebellion.

Dawson represented Algoma in the Legislative Assembly of Ontario from 1875 to 1878 and Algoma in the House of Commons of Canada from 1878 to 1891. As a politician, he was a consistent advocate for native rights. In 1875, he proposed that the riding of Algoma, then the only riding in the region of northern Ontario, become a separate territory, until it had enough population for provincial status. As a Scottish Roman Catholic, he was an anomaly in Protestant Ontario where most Scots were Presbyterian.

His brother William McDonell Dawson served as Crown Lands agent at Ottawa and was superintendent of the woods and forests branch in the Crown Lands department from 1852 to 1857. In 1858, he was elected to the Legislative Assembly of the Province of Canada for Trois-Rivières; he was defeated there but elected for the County of Ottawa in the 1861 general election. Another brother was the Roman Catholic priest Aeneas McDonell Dawson.

He died in Ottawa in 1902, virtually forgotten.

Electoral Record

References

Archives 
Simon James Dawson fonds, Library and Archives Canada. Archival reference number R4465.

Further reading
 Elizabeth Arthur, Simon J. Dawson C.E. (Thunder Bay, Ont. : Thunder Bay Historical Museum Society, 1987) 36 pages.
 Janet E. Chute and Alan Knight, "Taking up the torch : Simon J. Dawson and the Upper Great Lakes' Native Resource Campaign of the 1860s and 1870s," in With Good Intentions : Euro-Canadian and Aboriginal Relations in Colonial Canada (Vancouver : UBC Press, 2006), 106-131.
 Irene J. Dawson, "The Dawson Route 1857-1883 : a Selected Bibliography with Annotations," Ontario History, LIX (no. 1, March 1967), 47-54.
 Jack Munroe, "Mr Dawson's Road," Beaver, 71 (1) 1991, 6-11.

External links
 
 
 
 Ontario Plaques – Simon James Dawson
 Plan of Mr. Dawson's Road from Thunder Bay to Lake Shebandowan 1871

1818 births
1902 deaths
Canadian civil engineers
Conservative Party of Canada (1867–1942) MPs
Immigrants to Upper Canada
Members of the House of Commons of Canada from Ontario
Ontario Liberal Party MPPs
People from Aberdeenshire
Politicians from Thunder Bay
Politicians from Ottawa
Pre-Confederation Ontario people
Scottish civil engineers
Scottish emigrants to pre-Confederation Ontario
Scottish Roman Catholics